Trepobaris is a genus of flower weevils in the beetle family Curculionidae. There are at least four described species in Trepobaris.

Species
These four species belong to the genus Trepobaris:
 Trepobaris elongata Casey, 1892
 Trepobaris inornata Champion & G.C., 1909
 Trepobaris perlonga Champion & G.C., 1909
 Trepobaris yucatana Champion & G.C., 1909

References

Further reading

 
 
 

Baridinae
Articles created by Qbugbot